Matuumbi, also known as Kimatuumbi and Kimatumbi, is a language spoken in Tanzania in the Kipatimu region of the Kilwa District, south of the Rufiji river. It is a Bantu language, P13 in Guthrie's classification. Kimatuumbi is closely related to the Ngindo, Rufiji and Ndengereko languages. It is spoken by about 70,000 people, according to the Ethnologue.

Matuumbi is the augmentative plural of the Kimatuumbi word for 'hills' (singular form: kituumbi, class 7/8). Ki- is a Bantu noun class prefix attached to nouns of the class that includes languages (cf. Kiswahili, Kikongo).

Notes

References
 Odden, David (1996) The Phonology and Morphology of Kimatuumbi. (The Phonology of the World's Languages). Oxford: Clarendon Press.
 Krumm, B. (1912) Grundriss einer Grammatik des Kimatuumbi. Mitteilungen des Seminars für Orientalischen Sprachen, III.

Rufiji-Ruvuma languages
Languages of Tanzania